Lafayette's Quarters, also known as the Brookside Inn, is a historic home located on Wilson Road south-southeast of the intersection of Yellow Springs Road and Wilson Road in Tredyffrin Township, Chester County, Pennsylvania. This house is not opened to the public. The house was built in three sections, with the oldest dated to 1763.  The center structure is dated to about 1837–1839, and the western section was added between 1882 and 1900.  The oldest section is a -story, two bay by three bay, stuccoed stone structure with a gambrel roof.  The center section is of stuccoed stone, three bays long and two bays wide. The western section is a frame structure. It was renovated in 1948. During the American Revolution the house served as headquarters for Major General Gilbert du Motier, marquis de Lafayette in late-1777 and early-1778, during the encampment at Valley Forge.

It was listed on the National Register of Historic Places in 1974.

References

Valley Forge
Houses on the National Register of Historic Places in Pennsylvania
Houses completed in 1900
Houses in Chester County, Pennsylvania
Valley Forge National Historical Park
National Register of Historic Places in Chester County, Pennsylvania